Colin David (December 1937 – 25 February 2008) (کولن ڈیوڈ) was one of Pakistan's most popular painter-artists of the 1970s. He was mostly famous for his figurative nudes.

Early life and education
Colin David was born in Karachi, British India in December, 1937.
He started studying art in the Fine Arts Department of Punjab University, Lahore in 1956. In 1961, he graduated with a master's degree in Fine Arts. He went on to study at the Slade School of Art, London where he was guided by Sir William Coldstream.

Career
Colin David returned to Pakistan in 1962 and rejoined the faculty of the Punjab University, Lahore and taught there until 1964. He was known to his friends as a friendly, thoroughly professional and encouraging teacher.

Teaching
Colin David also taught at the National College of Arts, Lahore for over two decades.

Painting exhibits

Solo
 Lahore – 1962, 1965, 1970, 1974, 1983, 1990, 1993
 Karachi – 1970, 1974, 1980
 Rawalpindi – 1971, 1975

Collections
His paintings are displayed at the Clifton Art Gallery, Karachi, Pakistan Arts Council, Lahore, National Art Gallery, Pakistan and National Arts Gallery, Jordan.

Awards
 1979: Quaid-e-Azam Award for Painting
 1995: Pride of Performance Award by the President of Pakistan

Death
Colin David died on 25 February 2008 at Lahore, Pakistan.

References

External links
Colin David's profile and paintings at Clifton Art Gallery

1937 births
2008 deaths
Pakistani Christians
Pakistani educators
Recipients of the Pride of Performance
Alumni of the Slade School of Fine Art
University of the Punjab alumni
Artists from Karachi
20th-century Pakistani painters
Academic staff of the National College of Arts